SuW or SUW may refer to:

Mitsubishi SUW, a series of concept cars manufactured by Mitsubishi Motors
Richard I. Bong Airport, Wisconsin, IATA and FAA LID code
Surface warfare, one of the four divisions of naval warfare
Sung Wong Toi station, Hong Kong, MTR station code